See Grand China Air for the holding company of Hainan Airlines.

Tianjin Airlines ( —formerly Grand China Express Air) is a Chinese airline headquartered in Tianjin Binhai International Airport passenger terminal building, Dongli District, Tianjin, operating domestic scheduled passenger and cargo flights out of Tianjin Binhai International Airport.

History
Grand China Air was established in 2004 in an effort to merge the major aviation assets of Hainan Airlines, China Xinhua Airlines, Chang An Airlines and Shanxi Airlines, and received its operating licence from the Civil Aviation Administration of China in 2007. Scheduled flights were launched under the brand name Grand China Express Air, using 29-32 seat Fairchild Dornier 328JET aircraft. At that time, the company was China's largest regional airline, operating on 78 routes linking 54 cities. On 10 June 2009, the airline's name was changed to Tianjin Airlines. As of August 2011, 63 destinations are served (excluding those operated on behalf of Hainan Airlines), though by 2012, the airline intends to fly on more than 450 routes linking at least 90 cities, taking more than 90% of the domestic regional aviation market.

In mid-2015, Tianjin Airlines signed a contract for 22 Embraer aircraft (20 Embraer 195s and 2 Embraer 190-E2s). It is part of a larger agreement made in 2014 for 40 aircraft, the remaining 18 to be approved by the Chinese authorities. The first Embraer 195 will be delivered later in 2015 and the first Embraer 190-E2 in 2018.

The airline plans to launch international long-haul services and is to take delivery of its first Airbus A330 aircraft in 2016 to serve destinations in Europe, North America and southeast Asia.

In 2016, Tianjin Airlines launched long-haul services to Auckland in New Zealand, London-Gatwick in the UK and Moscow-Sheremetyevo in Russia. Long-haul services to Melbourne are to begin from October 2017.

In March 2018, Tianjin Airlines has replaced previously planned Xi'an - London Gatwick service to London Heathrow, starting 7 May 2018.

Destinations

Tianjin Airlines is a major player in the regional airline markets of Xinjiang and Inner Mongolia, known for shuttling passengers between the regional capitals to various feeder airports.

Fleet

, the Tianjin Airlines fleet consists of the following aircraft:

Fleet History
Tianjin Airlines has previously operated the following aircraft:
 Fairchild Dornier 328JET

Accidents and incidents
On June 29, 2012, there was an attempted hijacking of Tianjin Airlines Flight 7554, an Embraer ERJ-190, by six ethnic Uyghur men. Passengers and crew overpowered the hijackers. The aircraft returned to Hotan at 12:45 pm, where 11 passengers and crew and two hijackers were treated for injuries. Two hijackers died of injuries they sustained during the fight on the aircraft. This marked the first serious hijacking attempt in China since 1990.

References

External links 

  

Airlines of China
Airlines established in 2004
Airlines established in 2007
Companies based in Tianjin
Chinese brands
HNA Group
Chinese companies established in 2004
Chinese companies established in 2007